The Take is a four-part British television crime drama series, adapted by Neil Biswas from the novel by Martina Cole, that first broadcast on Sky1 on 17 June 2009. Directed by David Drury, The Take follows the activities of criminal sociopath Freddie Jackson (Tom Hardy), who has recently been released from prison, only to find that his cousin Jimmy (Shaun Evans) is attempting to make a name for himself on the back of his reputation. The series also stars Brian Cox, Kierston Wareing, Margot Leicester and Charlotte Riley among others.

Principal shooting for the series took place in Dublin. As well as original music by Ruth Barrett, the series also makes use of Kasabian's "Club Foot" as its opening theme. The Take was the first of two Cole novels to be adapted by Company Pictures for Sky1, the other being The Runaway, starring Jack O'Connell and Joanna Vanderham, that followed in 2011. The Take was released on Region 2 DVD on 6 July 2009 by ITV Studios Home Entertainment.

The series aired in the United States between 2 and 23 December 2009 on Encore. The first episode gathered 180,000 viewers, while the second attracted 152,000. The series was also released on Region 1 DVD on 28 August 2012, via BFS Entertainment. The series received critical acclaim for Hardy's portrayal of Freddie Jackson. Notably, Hardy and Charlotte Riley, who first met whilst working together on the series, later married.

Plot
Freddie Jackson (Tom Hardy) has just been released from prison. He has done his time, made the right connections and now he is ready to use them. His wife Jackie (Kierston Wareing) dreams of having her husband home but she has forgotten the rows and the girls Freddie cannot leave alone. His younger cousin, Jimmy (Shaun Evans), dreams of making a name for himself on Freddie's coattails. At first Freddie gets everything he ever wanted and Jimmy is taken along for the ride: a growing crime empire that gives them all the respect and money they have hungered for. Behind it all sits Ozzy (Brian Cox) - the legendary criminal godfather who manipulates Freddie and Jimmy's fates from prison cell.

Bitter, resentful and increasingly unstable, Jackie sees her life crumble while her little sister Maggie's (Charlotte Riley) star rises. In love with Freddie's cousin Jimmy, Maggie is determined not to end up like her sister. Freddie and Jackie watch Jimmy and Maggie achieve all the dreams that they failed to realise: love, family, stability and respect. Resentment and an inability to control himself force Freddie to put the business and his family at risk. Torn between being loyal to a cousin he loves and being true to his own destiny, Jimmy is forced to decide between protecting Freddie or the life he has built with Maggie.

Cast
 Tom Hardy as Freddie Jackson Jr.
 Shaun Evans as Jimmy Jackson
 Kierston Wareing as Jackie Jackson
 Charlotte Riley as Maggie Summers
 Margot Leicester as Lena Summers
 Brian Cox as Ozzy
 Jane Wood as Maddie
 Steve Nicolson as Lewis
 John Ashton as Joseph
 Megan Jossa as Kim
 Sara Stewart as Patricia
 Obi Abili as Des
 Macdara Joyce as Little Jimmy
 René Zagger as Altay Nevzat
 Sam Vincenti as Fatik Nevzat
 Nicholas Day as Freddie Jackson Snr.
 Mark Huberman as Harry
 Chelsea O'Toole as Kimberly
 David Schofield as Siddy Clancy
 Hayley Angel Holt as Kitty Mason
 Sammy Williams as little Freddie

Episodes

Reception

Awards and nominations

References

External links
Official site
IMDb
Company Pictures Site
The Take An ENCORE Original Event

2009 British television series debuts
2009 British television series endings
2000s British drama television series
2000s British crime television series
2000s British television miniseries
English-language television shows
Sky UK original programming
Television series by All3Media
Television shows set in London
Television series set in the 1980s
Television series set in the 1990s
Films directed by David Drury